John Caplyn may refer to:

 John Caplyn (died c. 1569), MP for Southampton and Bodmin
John Caplyn (died c. 1603), MP for Gloucester